Scopula umbratilinea is a moth of the  family Geometridae. It is found in Tanzania.

References

Endemic fauna of Tanzania
Moths described in 1901
umbratilinea
Insects of Tanzania
Moths of Africa